Melvin Okoro Kicmett (born May 19, 1988) is a Liberian footballer who played as a striker.

International career
He is also a member of the Liberia national football team.

Notes

1988 births
Living people
Expatriate footballers in Mali
Liberian footballers
Liberian expatriate footballers
CO de Bamako players
Melvin Kicmett
Melvin Kicmett
Association football forwards
Expatriate footballers in Cameroon
Expatriate footballers in Thailand
Melvin Kicmett
Melvin Kicmett
Liberian expatriate sportspeople in Thailand
Liberia international footballers